The Indigenous and Tribal Peoples Convention, 1989 is  an International Labour Organization Convention, also known as ILO Convention 169, or C169. It is the major binding international convention concerning indigenous peoples and tribal peoples, and a forerunner of the Declaration on the Rights of Indigenous Peoples.

It was established in 1989, with the preamble stating:
Noting the international standards contained in the Indigenous and Tribal Populations Convention and Recommendation, 1957, and

Recalling the terms of the Universal Declaration of Human Rights, the International Covenant on Economic, Social and Cultural Rights, the International Covenant on Civil and Political Rights, and the many international instruments on the prevention of discrimination, and

Considering that the developments which have taken place in international law since 1957, as well as developments in the situation of indigenous and tribal peoples in all regions of the world, have made it appropriate to adopt new international standards on the subject with a view to removing the assimilationist orientation of the earlier standards, and

Recognising the aspirations of these peoples to exercise control over their own institutions, ways of life and economic development and to maintain and develop their identities, languages and religions, within the framework of the States in which they live, and

Noting that in many parts of the world these peoples are unable to enjoy their fundamental human rights to the same degree as the rest of the population of the States within which they live, and that their laws, values, customs and perspectives have often been eroded, and...

Document
The convention is made of a Preamble, followed by forty-four articles, divided in ten parts. These are:

Part I. General Policy
Part II. Land
Part III. Recruitment And Conditions Of Employment
Part IV. Vocational Training, Handicrafts And Rural Industries
Part V. Social Security And Health
Part VI. Education And Means Of Communication
Part VII. Contacts And Co-operation Across Borders
Part VIII. Administration
Part IX. General Provisions
Part X. Final Provisions

Modification 
This Convention revised Convention C107, the Indigenous and Tribal Populations Convention, 1957.  Some of the nations ratifying the 1989 Convention "denounced" the 1957 Convention.

Purpose and history

The ILO 169 convention is the most important operative international law guaranteeing the rights of indigenous and tribal peoples. Its strength, however, is dependent on a high number of ratifications among nations.

The revision to the Convention 107 forbade governments from pursuing approaches deemed integrationist and assimilationist. It asserts the rights of indigenous and tribal peoples to choose to integrate or to maintain their cultural and political independence. Articles 8–10 recognize the cultures, traditions, and special circumstances of indigenous tribal peoples.

In November 2009, a court decision in Chile, considered to be a landmark in indigenous rights concerns, made use of the ILO convention law. The court ruled unanimously in favor of granting a water flow of 9 liters per second to Chusmiza and Usmagama communities.  The legal dispute had dragged for 14 years, and centers on community water rights in one of the driest deserts on the planet. The Supreme Court decision on Aymara water rights upholds rulings by both the Pozo Almonte tribunal and the Iquique Court of Appeals, and marks the first judicial application of ILO Convention 169 in Chile. Prior to this decision, some protests had escalated over the failure to respect the Convention 169 in Chile. Mapuche leaders filed an injunction against Michelle Bachelet and minister of the presidency José Antonio Viera Gallo, who is also coordinator of indigenous affairs, with the argument that the government had failed to fully comply with the Convention 169 clause on the right to "prior consultation", which must be carried out "in good faith and in a form appropriate to the circumstances, with the objective of achieving agreement or consent to the proposed measures," such as logging, agribusiness or mining projects in indigenous territories. There were already several examples of the successful use of the ILO Convention in Chile, like the case of a Machi woman who brought legal action to protect a plot of land with herbs used for medicinal purposes, which was threatened by the forest industry. Some concerns were however raised at the time over the political framework of the government being brought in line with the convention, and not the other way around.

Ratifications

References

External links 

ILO convention 169 (English) - International Labour Organization website
Campaign for Ratification of the 1989 ILO Convention – UNPO petition for the ILO 169
International Law and Indigenous Peoples: Historical stands and contemporary developments – S. James, Anaya, Cultural Survival
International Law – Survival International

Treaties concluded in 1989
Treaties entered into force in 1991
Indigenous law
International Labour Organization conventions
Treaties of Argentina
Treaties of Bolivia
Treaties of Brazil
Treaties of the Central African Republic
Treaties of Chile
Treaties of Colombia
Treaties of Costa Rica
Treaties of Denmark
Treaties of Dominica
Treaties of Ecuador
Treaties of Fiji
Treaties of Guatemala
Treaties of Honduras
Treaties of Mexico
Treaties of the Netherlands
Treaties of Nicaragua
Treaties of Norway
Treaties of Paraguay
Treaties of Peru
Treaties of Spain
Treaties of Venezuela
Treaties of Nepal
Treaties extended to Greenland
1989 in labor relations